Capital market imperfections are limitations that reduce the range of financial contracts that can be signed or honored. These restrictions are more common in capital markets. There are three basic reasons for that: First, lenders do not have full information about the borrower, whether they have the capacity to pay back their debt and/or whether they are willing to pay (asymmetric information). Secondly, the lender needs to trust the borrower to commit and to pay back his/her debt or there needs to be a third party to enforce the contract as it is more difficult to enforce contracts ex post (limited commitment). Finally, since the exchange does not happen at the same time, there is always room for renegotiation.

Perfect capital markets 

In perfect capital market case, assuming complete markets, perfect rationality of agents and under full information, the equilibrium occurs where the interest rates clear the market, with the supply of funds equal to the demand. This type of equilibrium is called Arrow-Debreu equilibrium, which is defined as there is a set of prices (in this case interest rates) under which demand and supply of the market are equal to each other. Moreover, we can analyze the firm's investment decision and its owner's consumption/saving decision separately (Fisher separation theorem). In addition to that, even in case of  bankruptcy risk, the resulting optimum choice of firm will be efficient as the interest rate increases to capture the bankruptcy risk. Therefore, the possibility of default of the borrower is not a main driving force that leads to imperfect capital markets.

Asymmetric information 
The main feature of financial markets that leads to imperfection is information asymmetry between borrowers and lenders. We see two main types of information asymmetries in capital markets:
 Adverse selection: Adverse selection occurs before the signing of the contract. The lack of information occurs since the lenders do not have information about the type of borrowers, i.e. whether the borrower tends to engage in riskier projects or not. There is positive correlation between possibility of selecting "bad" types as the interest rate increases since it is more costly for safe borrowers than risky borrowers since the possibility of not paying back his/her debt for the risky one is relatively higher. In adverse selection, the borrower type is only known by the individual and occurs when there are not enough tools to screen the borrower types. One of the examples of screening is offering different types of funds having different interest rates and asking different amounts of collateral in order to reveal the information about the type of the borrower. If the borrower is a "bad" type, then he/she will choose the type of funds having higher interest rates and requesting lower amount of collateral. However, in real world there are many types of borrowers which we can not categorize with just "bad" and "good" types. For each characteristic of the borrower lender needs to increase the number of instruments to fully reveal the information about the type of the borrower. Hence, in real life it is not possible for lender to fully reveal the type of borrowers.
 Moral hazard: The other type of asymmetric information is moral hazard which arises from the lack of information about the ex-post behavior of the borrower. After signing the contract, the borrower will tend make riskier project since he does not take the full responsibility of the funds. As the interest rate increases, the possibility of the borrower to engage in riskier projects increases in order to increase the expected return. In general, it is assumed that the riskier projects have higher expected return.
 Other possibility that results from the lack of information about the behavior of the borrower is that when the borrower declares default, the lender does not know if it is really true or not and what the value of the project/firm is after the default. Hence, it incurs some cost to verify the default. Hence, this also hinders the equilibrium from being efficient as the verification cost decreases the welfare.

Limited Commitment 

Another important characteristic that yields imperfection is that exchange does not happen simultaneously in capital markets. The borrower gets his/her funds, but the lender must rely on the promises of the borrower. One of the conditions for imperfect capital markets is default risk. The borrower may declare bankruptcy, and thus, may not pay the debt back. Hence, the borrower's promises, as well as the structure of the promises, are very important for the transaction to be realized. One of the options in dealing with the limited commitment problem is providing collateral. The contract is formed such that in case of default, the lender has all/some rights to seize the collateral. This is called a secured loan in finance. However, it does not fully solve the problem because there are costs associated with seizing the pledged asset. One source of these costs is the money and time spent enforcing the contract.

Another reason for capital market imperfections associated with limited commitment is the ability of the borrower to renegotiate the terms of the contract ex post. Even though the contract is signed as a secured loan, because of the enforcement costs, the lender never gets the full payment in case of default. Ex post, the borrower always has the option to offer more than the lender would get in case of default, but less than the full payment. That is why the incentive compatibility is needed to ensure binding contracts, in imperfect capital markets.

Relation with incomplete markets 
The other feature of the capital market leading to imperfections is that credit is not a homogeneous good. It is a different good in different states of world in different times and even given different people. In an idealized "perfect" market, economists expect the market to "achieve every desired exchange for homogeneous goods when there is only one price". Based on that, to have a perfect capital market, every agent may exchange funds at the existing single interest rate for each type of fund. However, in reality we do not have that many different types of credit/funds for each different states of world to have complete market.

Consequences of imperfections in capital markets 

With perfect information as the interest rate increases, expected return to the lender increases as the lender charges the borrower more for the lending service. However, with imperfect information there is also an indirect opposite effect. As the interest rate rises, the possibility of selecting riskier borrowers increases as the cost increases less for them as they may not pay it back. Hence, as the interest rate goes up, the return to the lender decreases only considering the adverse selection effect. Considering these two opposite effects, the lender may determine the interest rate to maximize the rate of return so it does not necessarily clear the market. In that situation, some individuals can not obtain any credit at the existing market interest rate although they are willingly to pay the market value. Hence, we see credit rationing as a result of imperfection in capital markets.

Credit rationing does not just caused from asymmetric information but also from limited enforcement in case of default. There are also costs used for law enforcement in order to get back the funds and in most of the case there is also possibility of not taking back at all if it was an unsecured loan. The problem of credit rationing arises most if the creditor does not have anything to provide as collateral. Even if he/she is a trustworthy person and would use the funds for good investment project and able to pay back his/her debt, the lender may not lend him/her so it leads to inefficient allocation of resources.

In macroeconomic perspective one of the consequences of the imperfect capital markets is insufficient investment. Since most of the time firms finance their investment from credit markets, lack of supply of funds leads to insufficient amount of investment causing inefficient allocation of funds in the economy. Even though it was true that every agent could borrow at the amount they were willing to, we could not have reached the efficient allocation because of the high market interest rate causing from the cost of screening and monitoring of the banks.

Based on the fact that in real world the capital markets are far from being perfect, we can clearly say that market clearing is a very specific result which may not hold in general.

Imperfections in international capital markets 

Enforcement of the contract is particularly difficult in an international set up. It is hard for a creditor to impose sanctions to a country that defaults. Hence, it is a much deeper problem considering the consequences of imperfections in international capital markets. It may highly reduce the country's ability to extract financial resources on international basis. the most fundamental reason is the sovereign risk that causes from the lack of a supranational legal authority, capable of enforcing contracts across borders. The main results of imperfect international capital markets are similar to domestic ones: risk and insufficient level of investment. Since the inefficiency of the economy in terms of investment is also related to the economic growth of the country, the consequences on investment and economic growth are more severe and affects the economies of the countries (especially developing countries) in macro level.

References 

Law and economics
Asymmetric information
Market failure
Financial markets